Amy Johanna Kenealy (born 6 April 1988) is an Irish former cricketer who played as a right-arm medium bowler. She appeared in 23 One Day Internationals and 24 Twenty20 Internationals for Ireland between 2008 and 2018. She played domestic cricket for Typhoons and Scorchers.

References

External links

1988 births
Living people
Cricketers from County Dublin
Irish women cricketers
Ireland women One Day International cricketers
Ireland women Twenty20 International cricketers
Typhoons (women's cricket) cricketers
Scorchers (women's cricket) cricketers